Lick Branch is a  long 1st order tributary to Dutch Buffalo Creek in Cabarrus County, North Carolina.

Course
Lick Branch rises about 3 miles east of Kannapolis, North Carolina in Rowan County, and then flows southeast into Cabarrus County to join Dutch Buffalo Creek about 1 mile west of Rimer.

Watershed
Lick Branch drains  of area, receives about 46.8 in/year of precipitation, has a wetness index of 411.61, and is about 51% forested.

References

Rivers of North Carolina
Rivers of Cabarrus County, North Carolina
Rivers of Rowan County, North Carolina